This list of 2011 motorsport champions is a list of national or international auto racing series with championships decided by the points or positions earned by a driver from multiple races where the season was completed during the 2011 calendar year.

Open wheel racing

Sports car and GT

Touring car racing

Stock car racing

Drifting

Truck racing

Rallying

Motorcycles

Road racing

Supermoto

See also
 List of motorsport championships

References

 
2011